The 2011 FIBA Europe Under-16 Championship was the 25th edition of the FIBA Europe Under-16 Championship. 16 teams featured in the competition, which was held in the Czech Republic, from July 28 to August 7. Croatia won the title for the third time, and the second in a row.

Teams

Group stages

Preliminary round
In this round, the sixteen teams are allocated in four groups of four teams each. The top three advanced to the qualifying round. The last team of each group played for the 13th–16th place in the Classification Games.

Times given below are in CEST (UTC+2).

Group A

Group B

Group C

Group D

Qualifying round
The twelve teams remaining were allocated in two groups of six teams each. The four top teams advanced to the quarterfinals. The last two teams of each group played for the 9th–12th place.

Group E

Group F

Classification round
The last teams of each group in the preliminary round competed in this Classification Round. The four teams played in one group. The last two teams were relegated to Division B for the next season.

Group G

Knockout round

Championship

5th–8th playoffs

9th–12th playoffs

Quarterfinals

Classification 9–12

Semifinals

Classification 5–8

11th place game

9th place game

7th place game

5th place game

Bronze medal game

Final

Final standings

Team roster
Lovre Bašić, Ivan Jukić, Paolo Marinelli, Domagoj Bošnjak, Mario Hezonja, Karlo Žganec, Dorian Jelenek, Tomislav Gabrić, Leon Tomić, Marko Arapović, Ivan Bender, Bruno Žganec

Head coach: Ante Nazor.

External links
FIBA Archive
Official Site

FIBA U16 European Championship
2011–12 in European basketball
2011–12 in Czech basketball
International youth basketball competitions hosted by the Czech Republic